Campiglossa misella is a species of fruit fly in the family Tephritidae.

Distribution
The species is found in the United Kingdom, Spain to Central Asia.

References

Tephritinae
Insects described in 1869
Diptera of Europe
Taxa named by Hermann Loew